Kalevi Mononen (25 March 1920 – 18 September 1996) was a Finnish cross-country skier who competed in the 1950s. He was born in Savonranta. He finished fifth in the 50 km event at the 1952 Winter Olympics in Oslo.

Cross-country skiing results
All results are sourced from the International Ski Federation (FIS).

Olympic Games

References

External links

1920 births
1996 deaths
People from Savonlinna
Olympic cross-country skiers of Finland
Cross-country skiers at the 1952 Winter Olympics
Finnish male cross-country skiers
Sportspeople from South Savo
20th-century Finnish people